Edward Howard or Ed Howard may refer to:

Politicians
Edward Howard (died 1620), Member of Parliament for Reigate
Edward Howard, 1st Baron Howard of Escrick (died 1675), British nobleman and parliamentarian
Edward L. Howard (1926–2011), Pennsylvania politician
Edward Stafford Howard (1851–1916), British Liberal politician and magistrate
Edward Howard, 1st Baron Lanerton (1809–1880), British naval commander and politician
Edward Howard, 2nd Earl of Carlisle (1646–1692), English Whig politician

Religion
Edward Henry Howard (1829–1892), English Roman Catholic cardinal
Edward Howard (bishop) (1877–1983), American prelate of the Roman Catholic Church

Writers
Edward Howard (novelist) (1793–1841), English novelist
Edward Howard (playwright) (1624–1712), playwright and poet, brother of Sir Robert Howard

Others
Edward Howard (admiral) (1476/7–1513), early naval commander and Lord High Admiral of England, close friend of Henry VIII
Edward Charles Howard (1774–1816), British chemist
Edward Howard (1813–1904), early time-piece maker in America and the founder of E. Howard & Co.
Edward Howard (public relations firm), an Ohio-based public relations firm
Ed Howard (lawyer) (born 1963), American lawyer
Edward Howard, 8th Earl of Suffolk (1672–1731), English peer
Edward Howard (actor) (1910–1946), American actor in films such as The Scarlet Horseman 
Edward Lee Howard (1951–2002), CIA case officer who defected to the Soviet Union
Edward Howard, 9th Duke of Norfolk (1686–1777), British peer
Edward Howard (surgeon) and 2001 winner of the Denis Browne Gold Medal
Ed Howard (baseball) (born 2002), American baseball player

See also
Ted Howard (disambiguation)